Zyxomma atlanticum is a species of dragonfly in the family Libellulidae. It is endemic to Uganda.  Its natural habitats are subtropical or tropical moist lowland forests and shrub-dominated wetlands.

References

Libellulidae
Endemic fauna of Uganda
Insects described in 1889
Taxonomy articles created by Polbot